Ur So Gay is the debut extended play (EP) by American singer Katy Perry. It was released digitally on November 20, 2007 by Capitol Records. A physical edition of the EP was released on January 15, 2008. The EP contains four tracks: the title track "Ur So Gay", a remix of the title track by American DJ Junior Sanchez, "Use Your Love" (a remake of the Outfield's 1986 song "Your Love"), and "Lost". "Ur So Gay" and "Lost" would later appear on Perry's second studio album, One of the Boys (2008).

Music
According to Perry, she had a couple of different choices in mind for covers. She initially wanted to record a Queen song, but could not think of one that was particularly club-worthy. While at a club with her friends, the Outfield's song "Your Love" was played. Perry said that when the song came on, every girl there went onto the dance floor and had "the best time", which is something that she wanted to capture on the EP.

Release
The EP was not expected to be a huge seller and only "a few thousand" copies were sold. According to Chris Anokute, Perry's A&R, the EP "did well in terms of building a press story but because people didn't run to iTunes to buy the EP some executives in the company started backpedalling".

Critical reception
Billboard senior editor Chuck Taylor believed that Ur So Gay had "all the potential to amuse the masses". He further highlighted the remix of its title track, referring to this as "ripe and ready for clubs—where gays are bound to embrace it".

Track listing

Release history

References

Katy Perry albums
2007 debut EPs
Capitol Records EPs